The Noose is a play written by Willard Mack.  It was later adapted for the films The Noose (1928) and I'd Give My Life (1936).

The play opened on Broadway October 20, 1926 at the Hudson Theatre. It is perhaps best known today for introducing the previously unknown Barbara Stanwyck. It also featured actors Rex Cherryman and Wilfred Lucas.

External links
The Noose at the Internet Broadway Database

Plays by Willard Mack
1926 plays
American plays adapted into films
Broadway plays